Robert Nicholas Johnson (born 30 March 1962) is an English retired professional footballer who played in the Football League for Brentford as a left back.

Career statistics

References

1962 births
Footballers from Kensington
English footballers
Association football fullbacks
English Football League players
Brentford F.C. players
Arsenal F.C. players
Hayes F.C. players
Harrow Borough F.C. players
Enfield F.C. players
Slough Town F.C. players
Yeading F.C. players
Isthmian League players
National League (English football) players
Living people